Rupesh Gowala   is an Indian politician member of Bharatiya Janata Party from Assam.  He is an MLA, elected from the Doom Dooma constituency in the 2021 Assam Legislative Assembly election.

References 

Bharatiya Janata Party politicians from Assam
Living people
People from Tinsukia district
Assam MLAs 2021–2026
Year of birth missing (living people)